August Wörndle von Adelsfried (22 June 1829, Vienna - 26 April 1902, Vienna) was an Austrian history painter.

Life and work 
He was born to Johann von Wörndle, Building Manager at the Hofburg (Imperial Palace). His brother, Edmund von Wörndle, also became a painter.

From 1844, he studied at the Academy of Fine Arts, Vienna. Under the influence of one of his instructors, Joseph von Führich, he became an admirer of the Nazarene movement. In 1853, he went to Rome on an Imperial scholarship and remained there until 1859. As an employee of Peter von Cornelius, he was involved in the creation of kartons for the "Campo Santo", a burial plot at the home of King Friedrich Wilhelm IV in Berlin. 

In 1868, he settled in Vienna. He married Fürich's daughter, Anna, in 1872. They had a son, who died in childhood, and a daughter, Paula, who became a nun ("Mother Felicitas") in the Order of St. Ursula. Later, he served as a tutor to the Archdukes, Otto and Franz Ferdinand.  

His most notable works include the frescoes in the chapel at Ambras Castle, and at the parish church of St. Laurentius in Wörgl.

Sources 
 
 "Wörndle von Adelsfried, August". In: Hans Vollmer (Ed.): Allgemeines Lexikon der Bildenden Künstler von der Antike bis zur Gegenwart, Vol.36: Wilhelmy–Zyzywi. E. A. Seemann, Leipzig 1947, pg.170

External links 

 Philip, Edmund and August von Wörndle from the Catholic Encyclopedia @ WikiSource

1829 births
1902 deaths
Austrian artists